Sagesse Babélé (born 13 February 1993) is a Congolese international footballer who currently plays as a midfielder.

Honours 
AC Léopards
Winner
 Congo Premier League (2): 2012, 2013, 2014
 CAF Confederation Cup: 2012

Runner-up
 CAF Super Cup: 2013

External links 
 

1993 births
Living people
Republic of the Congo footballers
Republic of the Congo international footballers
2015 Africa Cup of Nations players
Khaleej FC players
Association football midfielders
Expatriate footballers in Saudi Arabia
Republic of the Congo expatriate footballers
Republic of the Congo A' international footballers
2020 African Nations Championship players
AC Léopards players